Zhao Xiaoding is a Chinese photographer and cinematographer. He was nominated for the Academy Award for Best Cinematography for his work in the film House of Flying Daggers (2004).

Filmography

References

External links

Chinese cinematographers
Chinese photographers
1968 births
Living people
Beijing Film Academy alumni